Zara World is an Irish documentary series, produced by Fubar Films and screened on RTÉjr. The series premiered on Monday 13 October 2014. It features a seven-year-old girl called Zara who lives with her family in Dublin city. Filmed over six months, each episode features a small snapshot of Zara’s life. The series is produced by Fiona Bergin and filmed and directed by Fintan Connolly.

Plot 
Zara World follows Zara Gleeson as she goes about the business of being seven. Zara goes on trips to the beach, park, library, playground, zoo and aquarium as well as a day trip to Bray, plays games with her friends, does Taekwondo training and spends time with her family. Zara’s Dad Gordon, big sister, Ali, and younger brother, Zack play an important role in the documentaries.

Series 1 (2014)

Music 
The score for Zara World is written by Stephen Rennicks.

References

External links 
 

2014 Irish television series debuts
2010s in Irish television
Irish television shows
English-language television shows
Television shows set in the Republic of Ireland
RTÉ original programming